is a Japanese folk song. Despite the term "fushi/bushi" found in its name, the rhythm is in swung, ondo style. It is a song about coal mining, and it refers to old Miike Mine in Kyūshū (Tagawa City). It is a common song used in Bon dances during the Bon Festival, and the dance that accompanies it depicts actions in mines such as shoveling coal, throwing a bag of coal over the shoulders, wiping sweat from the brow or pushing a cart of coal.

Excerpt from Tankō Bushi 

Modern arrangements of Tankō Bushi replace the lyric "Miike Tankō" with "uchi no oyama," which in traditional mining dialect means "our coal mine" or "our coal pit," as Miike Mine is no longer in service, and the song is played at Bon dances outside of Kyūshū.

History
The song was recorded in Japan in 1932. It was originally recorded on 78 RPM as Victor V-41543.

A popular version  is the 1963 commercial recording featuring Suzuki Masao and Kikumaru, recorded on Victor of Japan, MV-1 (JES-1041).  The CD version is Victor of Japan MVK-1.

The version of Tanko Bushi most commonly heard in Bon Dances in Hawaii during the second half of the 1900's was the 1950 recording of Suzuki Masao with Japanese musicians.
It was recorded in 1950 in Japan by Yoshio Nakayama and released by The Folk Dancer Record Service as a 78 RPM MH 2010a.

This recording features five verses, with Suzuki Masao singing verses 1, 3 and 5 and a female singer on verses 2, 4 and 5.

Video
Tanko Bushi - Jishin Shamidaiko  - Public Performance
Tanko Bushi - Jishin Shamidaiko & Yuukyo Gumi Taiko - Public Performance
Tanko Bushi - featuring the 1950 recording - Public Performance

References

Japanese folk songs
Japanese-language songs